is a Japanese manga artist born in 1970. His manga are mostly his comedic take of an ecchi boy's harem romance themes. Most of his work has appeared in Weekly Shōnen Magazine, with Boys Be.and Gacha Gacha his best-known titles.

On September 14, 2022, Tamakoshi announced he had been diagnosed with stage 3 cancer and is undergoing four months of chemotherapy.

Works
 Boys Be... (1991–2018) (story by Masahiro Itabashi)
 Gacha Gacha (2002–2007)
 A-Girls (2003)
 Gomen ne, Maria-sama (2006)
 Do suru!? Paradise (2006)
 Que Sera Sera (2007)
 Makyou no Shanana (2009) (story by Hiroshi Yamamoto)
  (2012, Comic Birz, 3 volumes)
 Mobile Suit Gundam 0080: War in the Pocket (2021)

References

External links
Tamaya (Old site)

Living people
Manga artists from Osaka Prefecture
1970 births